The Ka'apor are an indigenous people of Brazil.

Ka'apor may also refer to:

Ka'apor language
Ka'apor Sign Language

See also
Ka'apor capuchin